The Rimutaka Incline Railway Heritage Trust is a non-profit, charitable trust in New Zealand that was established in 2003 with the objective of reinstating an operating heritage railway over the Remutaka Ranges using the original route of the Wairarapa Line between Maymorn and Featherston, including the world-famous Rimutaka Incline.

Foundation and objectives 
The trust was formed by a steering committee that had earlier been established to investigate the proposal, and was composed mainly of members from existing rail heritage organisations.

It was established with the goal of realising the following objectives:

 To plan, fund, reinstate and operate a tourist heritage railway on former railway route between Upper Hutt and Featherston, and any other directly or indirectly connected railway; 
 Acquire by agreement, lease or purchase such lands as are required to allow the reinstatement of the former railway route between Upper Hutt and Featherston and any other such lands as will further the objectives of the Trust; 
 Acquire by agreement, lease or purchase such items of railway rolling stock, tools and material to facilitate the construction and operation of the tourist heritage railway; 
 Raise funds for and facilitate the conservation and protection of the former railway route and heritage structures and features thereon; 
 To plan, fund and construct appropriate buildings, structures, infrastructure and facilities to facilitate the construction and operation of the tourist heritage railway; 
 To arrange interpretative displays for the public, to promote knowledge and education of heritage railways, and in particular the Rimutaka Incline Railway, the historic factors that led to its creation and raise awareness of the personalities involved; 
 Facilitate research, discussion, education and interchange of information on topics related to the Rimutaka Incline Railway and environs.

Timeline

Facilities and equipment

Rail vehicle shed 
The main rail vehicle shed is currently under construction nearing completion with a workshop annex having been completed

Locomotives 
Parts for NZR WB class locomotives 292 & 299 have been acquired by the Trust where there are being restored to working order.

NZR TR class No. 937 Diesel shunting locomotive has been acquired from KiwiRail and, having been restored, is used for shunting and construction duties.

NZR AB class No.745 North British built Pacific locomotive, makers No. 22880 of 1922. The locomotive was involved in a washout accident on 16 July 1956 and plummeted 50 feet, while hauling a full load of freight from Wanganui to New Plymouth. Both crew survived. Too expensive to recover it remained in situ built into the embankment at Hawera. The engine lay undisturbed until November 2001, when it was purchased for $1 by the Hooterville Heritage Trust, and in 2002 salvage work began after 46 years underground. The raised wreck minus tender was taken to Waitara. In 2007, The Taranaki Flyer Society Inc. was formed and AB745 was transported to its new home at the old railway goods shed at Stratford, where it was being restored. Lack of funds and the loss of the Stratford old railway goods shed led to the Society asking for expressions of interest in the locomotive. The Rimutaka Incline Railway Heritage Trust's proposal was accepted and it was moved to Maymorn in October 2013.

Two replica NZR H class "Fell" locomotives will be commissioned by the Trust to operate the incline section of their line for stage 3 of the project.

Wagons 
The Trust has acquired 13 YC-class ballast wagons and 2 Q-class coal hopper wagons, currently located at their Maymorn site, and plans to use them in the construction of its line and for ongoing track maintenance.

Carriages 
The Trust's fleet includes five NZR 56-foot carriages and one NZR 50-foot carriage.  These vehicles will be restored after the rail vehicle shed is completed.

Maymorn station 
A heritage-themed station based on the Troup-era Waimate station has been proposed for the Maymorn site. It was hoped to have this building completed by 2015, but this has not occurred.

Track 
Two tracks have been laid east of the rail vehicle shed which are currently being used for vehicle storage.  Tracks are also being laid in the rail vehicle shed as part of the construction of the shed's floor and inspection pits.

Two potential routes have been identified to connect the Trust's operation at the Maymorn site to the original railway formation.

Rolling Stock

NZR Steam locomotives

NZR Diesel locomotives

Industrial Diesel Locomotives

Project 
The trust proposes to progressively reinstate and operate the railway between Maymorn and Featherston in four stages, including:
 Stage 1, Upper Hutt to Summit: Reinstatement of railway line between new station at Maymorn and a station at Summit; operation using conventional motive power between Maymorn, Kaitoke and Summit; use of the national rail network between Upper Hutt and Maymorn.
 Stage 2, Wellington to Upper Hutt: Establishing links with Wellington to promote the railway as a tourist opportunity; possible operation on the national rail network between Wellington and Upper Hutt.
 Stage 3, Summit to Cross Creek: Reinstatement of the Rimutaka Incline between Summit and Cross Creek stations; operation using two new Fell locomotives and brake vans.
 Stage 4, Cross Creek to Featherston: Connection with the national rail network at or near Featherston; operation of return journeys to Featherston.

References

External links 
 Rimutaka Incline Railway Heritage Trust.  Official project/trust web site.
 Rimutaka rail pix's photostream.  Photos of project progress.

Rail transport in Wellington
2003 establishments in New Zealand
Railway inclines in New Zealand